This is a list of Sites of Community Importance in the Community of Madrid.

See also 

 List of Sites of Community Importance in Spain

References 
 Lisf of sites of community importance in Community of Madrid

Community of Madrid-related lists